The ʻĪao Theater is a Spanish Mission style theater opened in 1928, in the city of Wailuku, Maui, Hawaii. It was originally both a movie and vaudeville house, until it fell into disrepair in the 1980s. Facing possible demolition, in 1994, it was listed on the State of Hawaii's Register of Historic Places. It was placed on the National Register of Historic Places in 1995. It later became the home of Maui OnStage, a community-based theatrical organization.

History
In December 1927, Manuel Gomes Paschoal and H. B. Weller broke ground for Iao Theater on Market Street. The theater was designed by Edward Walsh. After nearly 9 months and $40,000 in construction costs, Iao Theater opened on August 22, 1928. The theater opened with a local play featuring local actors, and the showing of Sporting Goods starring Richard Dix at night.

The theater was one of several theaters in Wailuku, and was named after a small bait fish named the iao. Aside from screening movies, the theater also hosted live onstage performances. Notable events included appearances by Bob Hope, Betty Hutton, and Frank Sinatra for USO shows during World War II, plus showed such movies as Rio Rita, and the X-rated film Deep Throat (which got the theater owner arrested). In 1953, the Hawaii debut of From Here to Eternity was staged at the Iao. A snack concession was run by Harry Kaya for almost 40 years, from 1930 to the mid-1970s, called Harry's Sweets. The location was just outside the main theater entrance. Local Hawaiian music artists such as Kealiʻi Reichel and Amy Hanaialiʻi Gilliom also gathered experience at the Iao.

By the early 1980s, after the theater closed down, the threat of demolition loomed.  Maui Community theater first occupied the theater in 1984 for $200 a month, and community efforts commenced to help save the Iao from demolition. In July 1993, Maui County paid $882,000 to buy the  site and the theater itself from the Lyons family trust after plans to demolish or convert the theater for other purposes materialized and spent $1.8 million on a partial restoration. The Hawaii State Register of Historic Places listed the Iao on June 24, 1994. It is the only surviving historic theater on Maui. The Department of the Interior placed the theater onto the National Register of Historic Places on February 9, 1995.

Modern usage
, Maui Community Theater, doing business as Maui OnStage, uses the theater for various functions. Redevelopment of the area also has included a 43 stall parking lot behind the theater.

Gallery

Notes
a.  The book lists this reason, citing the theater was not named for Iao Valley.
b.  Maui News lists two contradicting plans in two separate articles; demolition to use the land for a shopping complex is referenced in one article  while an editorial lists conversion to offices as the reason that prompted Maui County to save the Iao Theater.

References

External links

http://mauionstage.com/

Theatres completed in 1928
Theatres on the National Register of Historic Places in Hawaii
1928 establishments in Hawaii
National Register of Historic Places in Maui County, Hawaii
Hawaii Register of Historic Places
Mission Revival architecture in Hawaii